Glen Daniel is an unincorporated community in Raleigh County, West Virginia, United States. Glen Daniel has a post office with ZIP code 25844.

Notable people
Joe L. Smith, West Virginia politician

References

Unincorporated communities in Raleigh County, West Virginia
Unincorporated communities in West Virginia